The Kapoor Tunnel is a straight  subterranean route which is the main transport of water from the Sooke Lake to the Westshore, City of Victoria, Esquimalt, and the Saanich Peninsula. When it was determined that the Sooke Flowline would no longer meet the region's needs, the decision was made to excavate the tunnel. Prior to construction of the flowline, Arthur Adams, the consultant for the flowline construction, had proposed the Kapoor Tunnel be built. Unfortunately, that era's technology was not yet up to the task.

Construction

The tunnel was formed by a miniature tunnel boring machine (TBM), which was built in Vancouver at a cost of $258,000. Excavation was undertaken from both ends with the intention of meeting in the middle. The machine was later abandoned and excavation was carried out manually due to the soft rock clogging the teeth and gears and causing motor burn outs. The contractor quit and the water district completed the task in 1967. On completion, the tunnel was an engineering success. The project was almost incident free with the only major injury occurring when a worker's eye was damaged while drilling into a hole containing an undetonated stick of dynamite.

The project was a challenging feat due to a variety of factors:

The rock the tunnel was being bored through was a crumbly, unstable shale
Close quarters meant that only one cart could travel in the tunnel at a time
Fresh air needed to be pumped in from the surface deep into the tunnel

Route

The tunnel runs from the head tank near Sooke Lake, which maintains a constant pressure to the Japan Gulch UV Plant near Goldstream Provincial Park.

Maintenance

This tunnel can convey 580 million litres/day, 10 times greater than the Sooke Flowline, and provides water to all municipalities, except Sooke and the Highlands. Its final cost was $5.6 million. The Sooke Flowline had been leaking and was vulnerable to blow downs and rock slides.

Every January, the tunnel is shut off and the city transfers over to the district's secondary Goldstream system. Workers walk the  route to look for cracks and other defects.

References

Tunnels in British Columbia
Tunnels completed in 1970